Kelambakkam is a suburban and residential neighbourhood of Chennai, India. It is located in the south-eastern portion of the city along the Old Mahabalipuram Road (OMR), and is about 5 km from Siruseri IT park and 12 km from Sholinganallur junction. It is another important junction after Sholinganalur, which connects GST road (Vandalur) and ECR road (Kovalam). Kelambakkam is considered as the southern gateway to Chennai city on OMR Road and comes under Zone-2 (Sholinganalur to Kelambakkam stretch) of OMR Road. 

Metro Train project-Phase 2 is under process which connects Madhavaram with Siruseri IT park (Deadline to be operational for this Corridor-3 by 2025).

Census 2011
The total population of Kelambakkam is around 20,000 and expected to be doubled by 2021. The literacy rate of this locality is 90.88%. The sex ratio in Kelambakkam is 1,018. 
More families are migrating to Kelambakkam due to huge residential and commercial development, good ground water availability and easy accessibility to all parts of Chennai city with excellent road infrastructure. 
According to recent survey, Chennai city will have a population of 15 million people by 2030 (current population in 2019 is 11 million). Since population has already reached saturation point till Sholinganallur in OMR Road, more people (around 10 lakh people) will start migrating in Sholinganallur–Kelambakkam stretch till 2030.

Schools in Kelambakkam
 St. Francis International School
 DAV Group of School (SM Fomra)
 Chettinad - Sarvalokaa Education International School
 Sushil Hari International Residential School
 Velammal New Gen CBSE School
 Little Millennium Preschool Kelambakkam
 Jagannath Vidyalaya CBSE School
 Billabong High International School
 Buvana Krishnan Matriculation Higher Secondary School
 St Mary's Matriculation Higher Secondary School
 Ilanthalir Kids Zone Preschool
 Kidzee Kelambakkam Play, Nursery School
 Government Higher Secondary School
 Nellai Math Institute (A Mathematics School in Kelambakkam)

Colleges nearby Kelambakkam
 IIT Madras- Scientific Discovery campus- PM Narendra Modi laid the foundation stone in 2021 for constructing a campus at a cost of Rs.1,000 crores (State government has given 163 acres of land in Thaiyur at 2017).
 VIT University
 SSN University(250 acre campus)
 Hindustan University
 Chettinad School of Architecture 
 IIITDM Kancheepuram (Indian Institute of Information Technology, Design and Manufacturing, Kancheepuram)
 Chettinad Academy of Research & Education (Deemed to be university under section 3 of the UGC Act)
 Chettinad college of Nursing
 Chettinad Hospital and Research Institute
 Dhanapalan College of Arts & Science
 SMK Fomra Institute of Technology
 Anand Institute of Technology
 PSB polytechnic college
 Tagore Medical college and Hospital

Hospitals
Chettinad Super Speciality Hospital (100-acre campus)
Praveena Hospital, Vandalur Road, Kelambakkam
Swaram Hospital
Supreme Hospitals
Apollo Diagnostics
Malar Diagnostics Centre (Since 2003)

Temples and Churches around Kelambakkam
Sai Baba Temple, Kelambakkam
Poorana Brahmam Temple, Sri RamaRajya Campus, Vandalur Road, Kelambakkam
Sri Ashta Dasa Buja Durga Lakshmi Saraswathi Temple, Sri RamaRajya Campus, Vandalur Road, Kelambakkam
Sri Karpaga Vinayakar Temple, Ganeshpuri, Sri RamaRajya Campus, Kelambakkam
Veera Anjaneyar Temple, Pudupakkam
Nithyakalyana Perumal temple, Thiruvidanthai beach temple (one of the 108 Divyadesas of Lord Perumal)
Thiruporur Murugan Temple
 Chengammal Sivan Temple
 Mareeswarar Temple (Thaiyur)
 Christ the Redeemer Catholic Church 
 Divine Mercy Church
 Mosque (one of the biggest mosques in OMR road).

Residential development
Due to rapid development, good water availability and excellent road infrastructure with easy accessibility to all parts of Chennai, lot of apartments and villas has came up in Kelambakkam and they are below. Also, Kelambakkam has witnessed lot of family migration in past few years. Proximity to employment opportunities, good asset appreciation, good road Infrastructure, proximity to beaches at ECR and other entertainment venues continues to attract more residents to this suburb.

Transport
Kelambakkam is well connected to almost all important destinations in Chennai city like T.Nagar, CMBT, Broadway, Central Railway station, Tambaram through frequent MTC bus services. New bus depot for Kelambakkam (Thaiyur) about 10 acres land is under construction for MTC bus shelter and also for new Kelambakkam bus terminus. On an average, MTC operates more than 400 bus services from Kelambakkam to all localities of Chennai city.

Also, Tamil Nadu government is constructing Biggest Bus Terminus (45 acres) at cost of Rs 410 crore in Vandalur which takes just 20 minutes to reach through Vandalur-Kelambakkam road. This bus terminus will be largest bus terminus in Asia and become operational from March 2022.

Metro Train project- Phase 2 is under process which connects Madhavaram with Siruseri IT park(Deadline to be operational for this Corridor-3 by 2025). Once Metro train is operational, it will be game changer for overall development in OMR road.

See also
 Chennai 
 Covelong Beach 
 Mamallapuram

References

External links

Villages in Kanchipuram district
Suburbs of Chennai